Dario Bodrušić (born 25 January 1983 in Bugojno, SR Bosnia and Herzegovina, SFR Yugoslavia) is a Bosnian-born Croatian football retired defender.

Club career
The defender played for NK Istra 1961 in the Croatian First League. In January 2011, he signed with A-League club Adelaide United.

After a short stint with the Reds Bodrusic was released on a free transfer along with youngsters Francesco Monterosso and Joe Costa. He returns to his second spell with Rudeš in July 2015, following his departure from TSV Hartberg. He later had another spell in Austria with SK Bischofshofen 1933.

International
He played for the Croatian U-21 team.

References

External links
 Profile at Nogometni Magazin

1983 births
Living people
People from Bugojno
Association football defenders
Croatian footballers
Croatia under-21 international footballers
NK Inter Zaprešić players
NK Slaven Belupo players
FK Dinamo Tirana players
HNK Rijeka players
NK Istra 1961 players
Adelaide United FC players
NK Rudeš players
TSV Hartberg players
NK Zagreb players
SK Bischofshofen players
Croatian Football League players
Kategoria Superiore players
A-League Men players
First Football League (Croatia) players
2. Liga (Austria) players
Austrian Landesliga players
Austrian Regionalliga players
Croatian expatriate footballers
Expatriate footballers in Albania
Croatian expatriate sportspeople in Albania
Expatriate soccer players in Australia
Croatian expatriate sportspeople in Australia
Expatriate footballers in Austria
Croatian expatriate sportspeople in Austria